The 1944 Kilkenny Senior Hurling Championship was the 50th staging of the Kilkenny Senior Hurling Championship since its establishment by the Kilkenny County Board.

On 8 October 1944, Éire Óg won the championship after a 7-09 to 4-04 defeat of Carrickshock in the final. It was their second championship title overall and their first title in five championship seasons.

Results

Final

References

Kilkenny Senior Hurling Championship
Kilkenny Senior Hurling Championship